The 2012 Franklin American Mortgage Music City Bowl was a post-season American college football bowl game held on December 31, 2012, at LP Field in Nashville, Tennessee. The fifteenth edition of the Music City Bowl began at 11:05 a.m. CST and aired on ESPN. It featured the NC State Wolfpack from the Atlantic Coast Conference (ACC) against the Vanderbilt Commodores from the Southeastern Conference (SEC) and was the final game of the 2012 NCAA Division I FBS football season for both teams.  The Wolfpack accepted their invitation to the game after attaining a 7–5 regular-season record, while the hometown Commodores accepted theirs after attaining an 8–4 record.

Teams

NC State

The Wolfpack finished in third place in the Atlantic Division with a 4–4 record, resulting in the firing of head coach Tom O'Brien after the season; assistant coach Dana Bible coached the Wolfpack in the bowl game.

This was the Wolfpack's first Music City Bowl.

Vanderbilt

The Commodores' season, on the other hand, was one of their more successful in recent history; finishing in fourth place in the SEC's Eastern Division with a 5–3 record, the Commodores accepted the bid to their hometown Music City Bowl.

This was the Commodores' second Music City Bowl; previously, they had played in the 2008 game, defeating the Boston College Eagles by a score of 16–14.  It was also the first time the Commodores have ever been to a bowl game in consecutive seasons; the previous season saw them reach the 2011 Liberty Bowl, losing to the Cincinnati Bearcats by a score of 31–24.

Game summary

Scoring summary

Statistics

References

Music City Bowl
Music City Bowl
Music City Bowl
NC State Wolfpack football bowl games
Vanderbilt Commodores football bowl games
December 2012 sports events in the United States